12 (American Song Book) is an album by Italian singer Mina, released in 2012.

In the album, Mina covers 12 standards of American music, originally published between 1930 ("Just a Gigolo") and 1970 ("Fire and Rain"). Among the others, she sings "Everything Happens to Me" for the third time (previously recorded in 1964 for the album Mina and in 1993 for Lochness) and "Love Me Tender" for the second time (previously covered for the 1991 album Caterpillar).

The album was certified gold by the Federation of the Italian Music Industry.

Track listing

Certifications

References

External links
Mina Mazzini official website

2012 albums
Mina (Italian singer) albums
Covers albums